Samarium phosphide is an inorganic compound of samarium and phosphorus with the chemical formula SmP.

Synthesis
Heating samarium and phosphorus:
 4 Sm + P4 → 4 SmP

Physical properties
Samarium phosphide forms crystals of a cubic system, space group Fm3m, cell size a = 0.5760 nm, Z = 4, with a structure similar to sodium chloride NaCl.

The compound exists in the temperature range of 1315–2020 °C and has a homogeneity region described by the SmP1÷0.982.

Chemical properties
Samarium phosphide readily dissolves in nitric acid.

Uses
The compound is a semiconductor used in high power, high frequency applications and in laser diodes.

References

Phosphides
Samarium compounds
Semiconductors
Rock salt crystal structure